is a railway station in the city of Minokamo, Gifu Prefecture, Japan, operated by the third sector railway operator Nagaragawa Railway.

Lines

Station layout
Maehirakouen Station has one ground-level side platform serving a single bi-directional track. There is no station building and the station is unattended.

Adjacent stations

|-
!colspan=5|Nagaragawa Railway

History
Maehirakouen Station was opened on December 11, 1986.

Passenger statistics
In fiscal 2013, the station was used by an average of 26 passengers daily (boarding passengers only).

Surrounding area
Maehira Park

See also
 List of Railway Stations in Japan

References

External links

 

Railway stations in Japan opened in 1986
Railway stations in Gifu Prefecture
Stations of Nagaragawa Railway
Minokamo, Gifu